Tarjei Vesaas's debutantpris is a prize awarded annually for the best first literary work in Norwegian. It is awarded by the Norwegian Authors' Union, and the organisation's 9-member Literary Caucus constitutes the jury for the prize. They choose the winner based on a free and independent evaluation on aesthetic criteria.

In accordance with an agreement between the Authors' Union and the Norwegian Publishers' Association, all newly published Norwegian literature is sent to all members of the Literary Caucus. The members thus choose the year's winner without there being any direct application for the prize. The winner is chosen at the Literary Caucus' annual 3-day January meeting, at which the caucus performs most of the tasks within its mandate, concerning stipends, guaranteed income and prizes. The prize is usually awarded in March.

The prize was instituted in 1964 by Tarjei Vesaas with the money he received as winner of the Nordic Council's Literature Prize that year. Reflecting his intent, the literary merit of the work is the most important criterion, but if possible the prize is awarded to a young writer, 35 at the most. Vesaas and his wife Halldis Moren Vesaas (who were not themselves involved in the judging) were delighted that in its second year the prize went to Jan Erik Vold, who had been their lodger in summer 1964 at the 'writer's hut' Juvstøyl.

Winners

References

Norwegian literary awards
Norwegian literature
Awards established in 1964
Literary awards honouring young writers
First book awards